Polyptychoides cadioui is a moth of the  family Sphingidae. It is known from Tanzania and Kenya.

References

Polyptychoides
Moths described in 2005